This is a list of the Australian species of the family Cosmopterigidae. It also acts as an index to the species articles and forms part of the full List of moths of Australia.

Chrysopeleiinae
Cholotis exodroma (Meyrick, 1897)
Cholotis semnostola (Meyrick, 1897)
Eumenodora encrypta Meyrick, 1906
Ithome lassula Hodges, 1962
Leptozestis anagrapta (Meyrick, 1897)
Leptozestis antithetis (Meyrick, 1897)
Leptozestis argoscia (Lower, 1904)
Leptozestis autochroa (Meyrick, 1915)
Leptozestis capnopora (Meyrick, 1897)
Leptozestis cataspoda (Meyrick, 1897)
Leptozestis charmosyna (Meyrick, 1921)
Leptozestis crassipalpis (Turner, 1923)
Leptozestis crebra (Meyrick, 1906)
Leptozestis cyclonica (Meyrick, 1897)
Leptozestis decalopha (Lower, 1904)
Leptozestis ecstatica (Meyrick, 1897)
Leptozestis epiphrixa (Meyrick, 1897)
Leptozestis euryplaca (Lower, 1893)
Leptozestis eximia (Meyrick, 1897)
Leptozestis gnophodes (Lower, 1904)
Leptozestis harmosta (Meyrick, 1897)
Leptozestis hestiopa (Meyrick, 1897)
Leptozestis melanopa (Meyrick, 1897)
Leptozestis ochlopa (Meyrick, 1897)
Leptozestis parascia (Meyrick, 1897)
Leptozestis phylactis (Meyrick, 1897)
Leptozestis psarotricha (Meyrick, 1897)
Leptozestis psoralea (Meyrick, 1897)
Leptozestis sedula (Meyrick, 1897)
Leptozestis spodoptera (Turner, 1923)
Leptozestis strophicodes (Meyrick, 1917)
Leptozestis tephras (Meyrick, 1897)
Leptozestis toreutica (Meyrick, 1897)
Leptozestis tropaea (Meyrick, 1897)
Leptozestis valida (Meyrick, 1919)
Orthromicta argonota Turner, 1923
Orthromicta galactitis Meyrick, 1897
Orthromicta semifumea Turner, 1923
Trachydora acrocyrta (Turner, 1923)
Trachydora acromianta (Turner, 1923)
Trachydora actinia Meyrick, 1897
Trachydora anthrascopa Lower, 1904
Trachydora aphrocoma Meyrick, 1897
Trachydora argoneura Lower, 1904
Trachydora astragalota Meyrick, 1897
Trachydora capnopa (Lower, 1894)
Trachydora centromela Lower, 1904
Trachydora chalybanthes Meyrick, 1897
Trachydora chlorozona Meyrick, 1897
Trachydora chrysodoxa Meyrick, 1915
Trachydora corysta Meyrick, 1897
Trachydora dionysias Meyrick, 1921
Trachydora droserodes Meyrick, 1897
Trachydora fumea (Turner, 1923)
Trachydora heliodora (Lower, 1894)
Trachydora heliotricha (Lower, 1894)
Trachydora illustris Meyrick, 1897
Trachydora iridoptila Meyrick, 1921
Trachydora leucobathra Lower, 1904
Trachydora leucura Meyrick, 1897
Trachydora macrostola (Turner, 1923)
Trachydora microleuca Lower, 1904
Trachydora molybdimera Lower, 1904
Trachydora musaea Meyrick, 1897
Trachydora nomodoxa Meyrick, 1897
Trachydora oxypeuces Turner, 1939
Trachydora oxyzona Meyrick, 1897
Trachydora peroneta Meyrick, 1897
Trachydora placophanes Meyrick, 1897
Trachydora polyzona Lower, 1904
Trachydora porphyrescens (Lower, 1894)
Trachydora psammodes Meyrick, 1897
Trachydora pygaea (Turner, 1923)
Trachydora stephanopa Meyrick, 1897
Trachydora tephronota (Turner, 1923)
Trachydora thyrsophora Meyrick, 1897
Trachydora zophopepla Lower, 1904

Cosmopteriginae
Cosmopterix aculeata Meyrick, 1909
Cosmopterix attenuatella (Walker, 1864)
Cosmopterix calliochra (Turner, 1926)
Cosmopterix chalcelata (Turner, 1923)
Cosmopterix chlorochalca (Meyrick, 1915)
Cosmopterix cuprea Lower, 1916
Cosmopterix dulcivora Meyrick, 1919
Cosmopterix epizona (Meyrick, 1897)
Cosmopterix heliactis (Meyrick, 1897)
Cosmopterix isoteles (Meyrick, 1919)
Cosmopterix macrula (Meyrick, 1897)
Cosmopterix mystica (Meyrick, 1897)
Cosmopterix phaesphora (Turner, 1923)
Diatonica macrogramma Meyrick, 1921
Echinoscelis pandani (Turner, 1923)
Glaphyristis lithinopa Meyrick, 1917
Glaphyristis marmarea Meyrick, 1897
Haplochrois chlorometalla Meyrick, 1897
Haplochrois tanyptera Turner, 1923
Haplochrois thalycra Meyrick, 1897
Heureta cirrhodora (Meyrick, 1915)
Isorrhoa aetheria (Meyrick, 1897)
Isorrhoa ancistrota (Turner, 1923)
Isorrhoa aphrosema (Meyrick, 1897)
Isorrhoa atmozona Turner, 1917
Isorrhoa implicata Meyrick, 1920
Isorrhoa loxoschema Turner, 1923
Labdia anarithma (Meyrick, 1889)
Labdia ancylosema Turner, 1923
Labdia apenthes Turner, 1939
Labdia aresta Turner, 1926
Labdia argophracta Turner, 1923
Labdia argyrozona (Lower, 1904)
Labdia arimaspia (Meyrick, 1897)
Labdia auchmerodes Turner, 1939
Labdia autotoma (Meyrick, 1919)
Labdia bathrosema (Meyrick, 1897)
Labdia bryomima (Meyrick, 1897)
Labdia calthula Turner, 1923
Labdia ceraunica (Meyrick, 1897)
Labdia chalcoplecta Turner, 1933
Labdia charisia (Meyrick, 1897)
Labdia chryselectra (Meyrick, 1897)
Labdia cosmangela Meyrick, 1923
Labdia crocotypa Turner, 1923
Labdia cyanogramma (Meyrick, 1897)
Labdia deliciosella Walker, 1864
Labdia ejaculata Meyrick, 1921
Labdia eumelaena (Meyrick, 1897)
Labdia glaucoxantha Meyrick, 1921
Labdia hexaspila Turner, 1923
Labdia hierarcha (Meyrick, 1897)
Labdia irrigua (Meyrick, 1915)
Labdia ischnotypa Turner, 1923
Labdia leucombra (Meyrick, 1897)
Labdia leuconota Turner, 1923
Labdia microchalca Meyrick, 1921
Labdia mitrophora Turner, 1923
Labdia myrrhicoma (Meyrick, 1917)
Labdia nesophora (Meyrick, 1897)
Labdia niphocera Turner, 1923
Labdia niphostephes Turner, 1923
Labdia ochrostephana Turner, 1923
Labdia orthoschema Turner, 1923
Labdia oxysema (Meyrick, 1897)
Labdia oxytoma (Meyrick, 1897)
Labdia pammeces Turner, 1923
Labdia pantophyrta Turner, 1923
Labdia phaeocala Turner, 1926
Labdia pileata (Meyrick, 1897)
Labdia promacha (Meyrick, 1897)
Labdia rhadinopis Turner, 1923
Labdia rhoecosticha Turner, 1923
Labdia schismatias (Meyrick, 1897)
Labdia symbolias (Meyrick, 1906)
Labdia thalamaula (Meyrick, 1915)
Labdia thermophila (Lower, 1900)
Labdia triploa Turner, 1923
Labdia tristoecha Turner, 1923
Labdia trivincta (Meyrick, 1897)
Labdia zonobela Turner, 1923
Limnaecia adiacrita Turner, 1923
Limnaecia anisodesma Lower, 1904
Limnaecia bisignis Meyrick, 1921
Limnaecia callimitris Meyrick, 1897
Limnaecia camptosema Meyrick, 1897
Limnaecia charactis Meyrick, 1897
Limnaecia chionospila Meyrick, 1897
Limnaecia chrysonesa Meyrick, 1897
Limnaecia chrysothorax Meyrick, 1920
Limnaecia cirrhosema Turner, 1923
Limnaecia cirrhozona Turner, 1923
Limnaecia crossomela Lower, 1908
Limnaecia cybophora Meyrick, 1897
Limnaecia definitiva (T.P. Lucas, 1901)
Limnaecia elaphropa Turner, 1923
Limnaecia epimictis Meyrick, 1897
Limnaecia eristica Meyrick, 1919
Limnaecia eugramma Lower, 1899
Limnaecia hemidoma Meyrick, 1897
Limnaecia hemimitra Turner, 1923
Limnaecia heterozona Lower, 1904
Limnaecia ida Lower, 1908
Limnaecia iriastis Meyrick, 1897
Limnaecia isodesma Lower, 1904
Limnaecia isozona Meyrick, 1897
Limnaecia leptomeris Meyrick, 1897
Limnaecia leptozona Turner, 1923
Limnaecia leucomita Turner, 1923
Limnaecia loxoscia Lower, 1923
Limnaecia lunacrescens (T.P. Lucas, 1901)
Limnaecia melanoma (Lower, 1897)
Limnaecia monoxantha (Meyrick, 1922)
Limnaecia novalis Meyrick, 1920
Limnaecia ochrozona Meyrick, 1897
Limnaecia orbigera Turner, 1923
Limnaecia orthochroa (Lower, 1899)
Limnaecia pallidula Turner, 1923
Limnaecia phragmitella Stainton, 1851
Limnaecia pycnogramma (Lower, 1918)
Limnaecia platychlora Meyrick, 1915
Limnaecia platyochra Turner, 1923
Limnaecia platyscia Turner, 1923
Limnaecia polyactis Meyrick, 1921
Limnaecia polycydista Turner, 1926
Limnaecia pterolopha Meyrick, 1920
Limnaecia scoliosema Meyrick, 1897
Limnaecia stenosticha Turner, 1926
Limnaecia symplecta Turner, 1923
Limnaecia syntaracta Meyrick, 1897
Limnaecia tetraplanetis Meyrick, 1897
Limnaecia triplaneta Meyrick, 1921
Limnaecia trisema Meyrick, 1897
Limnaecia trissodesma (Meyrick, 1887)
Limnaecia trixantha (Lower, 1920)
Limnaecia xanthopelta Lower, 1903
Limnaecia xanthopis Meyrick, 1920
Limnaecia zonomacula Lower, 1908
Limnaecia zotica Meyrick, 1921
Macrobathra allocrana Turner, 1916
Macrobathra allophyla (Turner, 1944)
Macrobathra alternatella (Walker, 1864)
Macrobathra anacampta Meyrick, 1914
Macrobathra anemarcha Meyrick, 1886
Macrobathra anemodes Meyrick, 1886
Macrobathra aneurae Turner, 1932
Macrobathra aphristis Meyrick, 1889
Macrobathra arrectella (Walker, 1864)
Macrobathra asemanta Lower, 1894
Macrobathra astrota Meyrick, 1914
Macrobathra baliomitra Turner, 1932
Macrobathra basisticha (Turner, 1936)
Macrobathra bigerella (Walker, 1864)
Macrobathra brontodes Meyrick, 1886
Macrobathra callipetala Turner, 1932
Macrobathra callispila Turner, 1916
Macrobathra ceraunobola Meyrick, 1886
Macrobathra chryseostola Turner, 1932
Macrobathra chrysospila Meyrick, 1886
Macrobathra chrysotoxa Meyrick, 1886
Macrobathra cirrhodora Meyrick, 1915
Macrobathra constrictella (Walker, 1864)
Macrobathra crococosma Meyrick, 1922
Macrobathra dasyplaca Lower, 1894
Macrobathra decataea Meyrick, 1914
Macrobathra desmotoma Meyrick, 1886
Macrobathra diplochrysa Lower, 1894
Macrobathra dispila Turner, 1932
Macrobathra drosera Lower, 1901
Macrobathra embroneta Turner, 1932
Macrobathra epimela (Lower, 1894)
Macrobathra erythrocephala (Lower, 1904)
Macrobathra eudesma Lower, 1900
Macrobathra euryleuca Meyrick, 1886
Macrobathra euryxantha Meyrick, 1886
Macrobathra euspila Turner, 1932
Macrobathra galenaea Meyrick, 1902
Macrobathra gastroleuca Lower, 1905
Macrobathra hamaxitodes Meyrick, 1886
Macrobathra harmostis Meyrick, 1889
Macrobathra heminephela Meyrick, 1886
Macrobathra hemitropa Meyrick, 1886
Macrobathra heterocera Lower, 1894
Macrobathra heterozona Meyrick, 1889
Macrobathra hexadyas Meyrick, 1906
Macrobathra homocosma Meyrick, 1902
Macrobathra honoratella (Walker, 1864)
Macrobathra humilis (Turner, 1933)
Macrobathra hyalistis Meyrick, 1889
Macrobathra isoscelana Lower, 1893
Macrobathra leucopeda Meyrick, 1886
Macrobathra leucozancla Turner, 1932
Macrobathra lychnophora Turner, 1932
Macrobathra melanargyra Meyrick, 1886
Macrobathra melanomitra Meyrick, 1886
Macrobathra melanota Meyrick, 1886
Macrobathra mesopora Meyrick, 1886
Macrobathra micropis Lower, 1894
Macrobathra microspora Lower, 1900
Macrobathra monoclina Meyrick, 1915
Macrobathra monostadia Meyrick, 1886
Macrobathra myriophthalma Meyrick, 1886
Macrobathra nephelomorpha Meyrick, 1886
Macrobathra nimbifera Turner, 1932
Macrobathra niphadobola Meyrick, 1886
Macrobathra nomaea Meyrick, 1914
Macrobathra notozyga Meyrick, 1914
Macrobathra paracentra Lower, 1893
Macrobathra parthenistis Meyrick, 1889
Macrobathra phernaea Lower, 1899
Macrobathra philopsamma Lower, 1900
Macrobathra phryganina Turner, 1932
Macrobathra platychroa Lower, 1897
Macrobathra platyzona Turner, 1932
Macrobathra polypasta Turner, 1932
Macrobathra pompholyctis Meyrick, 1889
Macrobathra porphyrea Meyrick, 1886
Macrobathra psathyrodes Turner, 1932
Macrobathra rhodospila Meyrick, 1886
Macrobathra rhythmodes Turner, 1916
Macrobathra rubicundella (Walker, 1864)
Macrobathra sarcoleuca Meyrick, 1915
Macrobathra stenosema Turner, 1932
Macrobathra synacta Meyrick, 1920
Macrobathra synastra Meyrick, 1886
Macrobathra syncoma Lower, 1899
Macrobathra trimorpha Meyrick, 1889
Macrobathra trithyra Meyrick, 1886
Macrobathra vexillariata Lucas, 1901
Macrobathra vividella (R. Felder & Rogenhofer, 1875)
Macrobathra xanthoplaca Meyrick, 1902
Macrobathra xuthocoma Meyrick, 1886
Macrobathra xylopterella (Walker, 1864)
Macrobathra zonodesma Lower, 1900
Mimodoxa dryina Lower, 1901
Mimodoxa empyrophanes Turner, 1932
Mimodoxa loxospila Turner, 1932
Mimodoxa metallica (Lower, 1899)
Mimodoxa phaulophanes Turner, 1932
Mimodoxa tricommatica Turner, 1932
Morphotica mirifica Meyrick, 1915
Mothonodes obusta (Meyrick, 1921)
Otonoma anemois Meyrick, 1897
Otonoma leucochlaena Meyrick, 1919
Otonoma sophronica Meyrick, 1920
Otonoma sphenosema (Meyrick, 1897)
Paratheta calyptra Lower, 1899
Paratheta lasiomela Lower, 1899
Paratheta ochrocoma Lower, 1899
Pechyptila rhodocharis Meyrick, 1921
Persicoptila anthophyes Turner, 1926
Persicoptila arenosa Turner, 1917
Persicoptila dasysceles Turner, 1917
Persicoptila hesperis Meyrick, 1897
Persicoptila mimochora Meyrick, 1897
Persicoptila oenosceles Turner, 1917
Persicoptila peltias Meyrick, 1897
Persicoptila ramulosa Meyrick, 1921
Persicoptila rhodocnemis Meyrick, 1915
Persicoptila tritozona Turner, 1917
Persicoptila vinosa Meyrick, 1921
Phaneroctena homopsara Turner, 1923
Phaneroctena pentasticta Turner, 1923
Phaneroctena spodopasta Turner, 1923
Pyroderces aellotricha (Meyrick, 1889)
Pyroderces anaclastis Meyrick, 1897
Pyroderces argobalana Meyrick, 1915
Pyroderces eupogon Turner, 1926
Pyroderces falcatella (Stainton, 1859)
Pyroderces hapalodes Turner, 1923
Pyroderces incertulella (Walker, 1864)
Pyroderces mesoptila Meyrick, 1897
Pyroderces pogonias Turner, 1923
Pyroderces pyrrhodes Meyrick, 1897
Pyroderces rileyi (Walsingham, 1882)
Pyroderces tenuilinea Turner, 1923
Pyroderces terminella (Walker, 1864)
Rhadinastis microlychna Meyrick, 1897
Rhadinastis sideropa Meyrick, 1897
Scaeosopha mitescens (T.P. Lucas, 1901)
Stagmatophora argyrostrepta (Meyrick, 1897)
Stagmatophora clinarcha Meyrick, 1921
Stagmatophora haploceros Turner, 1926
Stagmatophora niphocrana Turner, 1926
Stagmatophora notoleuca Turner, 1923
Stagmatophora tetradesma (Meyrick, 1897)
Tetraconta clepsimorpha Turner, 1932
Trissodoris euphaedra (Lower, 1904)
Trissodoris honorariella (Walsingham, 1907)
Xestocasis balanochrysa Meyrick, 1915
Xestocasis colometra Meyrick, 1915
Xestocasis hololampra Meyrick, 1915

External links 
Cosmopterigidae at Australian Faunal Directory
Cosmopterigidae at lepidoptera.butterflyhouse

Australia